Spartak Stadion is a football stadium in Mogilev, Belarus. It is the home stadium of Dnepr Mogilev of the Belarusian Premier League. The stadium holds 7,350 spectators.

History
The stadium was opened in 1956 and has been used by Dnepr Mogilev ever since.

International use
The stadium was used Dnepr Mogilev in European Cups games. It also has been used as a home venue by Belarus women's national team.

External links
Stadium page at Dnepr Mogilev website
Official website

Football venues in Belarus
Sports venues in Mogilev
Buildings and structures in Mogilev Region
Sports venues completed in 1956
FC Dnepr Mogilev